Ptyodactylus orlovi is a species of gecko in the family Phyllodactylidae. The species is native to the eastern Arabian Peninsula.

Etymology

The specific name, orlovi, is in honor of Russian herpetologist Nikolai Orlov.

Geographic range
P. orlovi is found in Oman and adjacent United Arab Emirates.

Habitat

Description

Behavior
P. orlovi is diurnal, terrestrial, and rupicolous.

Reproduction
P. orlovi is oviparous. In summer, an adult female may lay a clutch of two eggs in a communal nesting site.

References

Further reading
Nazarov R, Melnikov D, Melnikova E (2013). "Three New Species of Ptyodactylus (Reptila; Squamata; Phyllodactylidae) from the Middle East". Russian Journal of Herpetology 20 (2): 147–162. (Ptyodactylus orlovi, new species).

Ptyodactylus
Reptiles described in 2013